The Abu Dhabi Tour was a men's cycling stage race that took place in the United Arab Emirates, held annually between 2015 and 2018. In 2019 The Abu Dhabi Tour merged with the Dubai Tour to become the UAE Tour.

History
When inaugurated, it was part of the UCI Asia Tour, ranked as a category 2.HC event, the second tier of professional stage races. The race was initially scheduled for October, as one of the last races of the cycling season, occupying the calendar slot formerly held by the cancelled Tour of Beijing. The event is organised by RCS Sport, which also organises the Giro d'Italia and the nearby Dubai Tour.

In 2015 UCI organized the first International Cycling Gala on the evening of the final day of the Abu Dhabi Tour, to celebrate the end of the cycling season. The event's organizers expressed their hope that the race be included in the UCI World Tour. In 2016 the Abu Dhabi Tour started two days after the Cycling Gala in the week following the Road World Championships in Qatar.

The third edition of the Abu Dhabi Tour was added to the 2017 UCI World Tour and scheduled to be held at the beginning of the season, in February 2017.

In 2019, the Abu Dhabi Tour was merged with the Dubai Tour to become the UAE Tour.

Route
The first two editions of the race were made up of four stages; three of which flat and suited to the sprinters and one mountain-top finish at Jebel Hafeet. The final stage is a circuit race around the Yas Marina motor-racing track which take place at twilight, as does the Abu Dhabi Grand Prix.

Overall winners

References

External links

 
UCI World Tour races
UCI Asia Tour races
Cycle races in the United Arab Emirates
Sport in the Emirate of Abu Dhabi
Recurring sporting events established in 2015
2015 establishments in the United Arab Emirates
Defunct cycling races the United Arab Emirates
Recurring sporting events disestablished in 2018
2018 disestablishments in the United Arab Emirates